Ceroplesis hottentotta is a species of beetle in the family Cerambycidae. It was described by Johan Christian Fabricius in 1775. It is known from South Africa. It contains the variety Ceroplesis hottentotta var. disjuncta.

References

hottentotta
Beetles described in 1775
Taxa named by Johan Christian Fabricius